Dungeon Lords may refer to:

 Dungeon Lords (board game), a 2009 euro-style game
 Dungeon Lords (video game), a 2005 game from DreamCatcher Interactive and Typhoon Games